The Lebrón Brothers are a musical family born in Puerto Rico and raised in Brooklyn, New York.
The brothers are Pablo, Jose, Angel, Carlos and Frankie.  They provide the vocals and rhythm section of the band. 
Members of the original band were Gabe Gil - alto sax, Tito Ocasio - Timbales, Hector Lebron - Congas, Eddie DeCupe - Trumpet, Elliot Rivera, vocals, Felix Rivera, trumpet. Frankie LeBron later replaced Frankie Rodriguez who replaced his cousin Hector LeBron on congas.

Biography 

The brothers were born in Aguadilla, Puerto Rico to Francisco Lebron Feliciano, who was born in Lares, P.R. and Julia Lebron Rosa Sosa, born in Aguada, P.R. but were raised in Brooklyn, New York.

They grew up in a musical environment. The eldest, Pablo, was part of a trio that went by the name of "Las Tres Monedas."
Their sister Maria sang on radio shows in Puerto Rico before the family relocated to the U.S.A.
The younger brothers formed their own rhythm and blues band at early ages. They performed in talent shows in Brooklyn.
In 1966, they heard something that interested them over the radio. It was the "Boogaloo". The boogaloo was a mix of Latin rhythms with English lyrics. They were especially influenced by "The Joe Cuba Sextette" - a song called, "To Be With You" in particular.
Jose gave up playing guitar and began playing piano. Angel went from Bass guitar to an upright bass {baby bass}. Carlos went from guitar to bongos and cowbell.

Early in 1967, Jose called Cotique Records, spoke to George Goldner and asked for an audition. The audition was set for the following week. George was impressed with their audition, but there was one problem — they had no original songs.
George Goldner said he would return in one week and asked them to have some original songs ready that he could listen to. The brothers got together to see what could be done. Even though Jose had never composed a song before, he was elected to do the writing. In that one week, he managed to write eight songs. Pablo was asked by his brothers to do one song with them, and he decided to leave his own band {La Sonora Arecibena} and join his brothers. They recorded one week later. The Lebron Brothers' first album, "Psychedelic Goes Latin,"  was a huge success, and the band would end up recording 16 albums for the Cotique label.

The Lebron Brothers brought their own style to the Latin genre, one that blended Motown soul and Latin rhythms. Their coros was more like soul group backgrounds

In 1970,  Jose Lebron composed '"SALSA Y CONTROL," a song that is credited with helping to give a broad category of Latin music the name "salsa." Up until then the mambo, son montuno, guaracha, guaguanco, cha cha cha etc. had no genre. "SALSA Y CONTROL" helped give this music the name that is now known and acknowledged worldwide. While this may sound good for salsa, it is not completely correct, the first group to use the name salsa was Cheo Marquetti y los salseros, a Cuban group in the late 1950s but the term salsa was mainly adopted to represent a new combination of sounds and instruments in the late 1960s... largely in connection with Fania and where a TERM was needed to be able to market the new sounds.

In 1982, Pablo Lebron suffered a stroke and required the use of a wheelchair. On July 13, 2010, Pablo Lebron died.

The Lebron Brothers are still active. They tour the world and in recent years have recorded number one songs such as 
SI ME PERMITE, CULEBRA, NO ME CELES, and COMPLICADOS.
The Lebron Brothers won the 2012 award for best INTERNATIONAL SALSA BAND in Cali, Colombia.

Discography
The latest releases of the orchestra have been released as singles, in the city of Cali Colombia in this order, SI ME PERMITE, 2007   -   VERDADERO GUAGUANCO, 2008   -   COMPLICADOS - CULEBRA, 2009 - NO ME CELES, 2010–69 - QUE HACES AQUI 2012.

The latest releases of the orchestra have been released as singles, in the city of Cali Colombia in this order, SI ME PERMITE, 2007   -   VERDADERO GUAGUANCO, 2008   -   COMPLICADOS - CULEBRA, 2009 - NO ME CELES, 2010–69 - QUE HACES AQUI 2012.

Members
 Jose Lebron - Piano, Vocals, Composition, Arrangement and Choir 
 Angel Lebron - Bass, Vocals, Composition, Arrangement
 Carlos Lebron - Bongo, Percussionist, Bell, Vocals, Composition
 Frank Lebron - Conga, Percussionist
 Pablo Lebron - Vocals

References

External links
 http://hermanoslebron.com/discografia

Salsa music groups
Musical groups established in 1965